Tower and Towers are English surnames which may refer to:

Tower
People with the surname Tower: 

 Alan Tower Waterman (1892–1967), American physicist
 Ashley B. Tower (1847–1901), American mill architect and engineer 
 Charlemagne Tower (1809–1889), American lawyer, soldier, and capitalist
 Charlemagne Tower, Jr. (1848–1923), American diplomat
 David H. Tower (1832–1907), American mill architect and engineer
 Henrietta Tower (1856-1933), American art collectionist and wife of George Washington Wurts
 Ion Tower (1889–1940), British Royal Navy officer, World War II air raid victim
 Jeremiah Tower (born 1942), American chef
 Joan Tower (born 1938), American composer of classical music
 John Tower (1925–1991), American politician
 Wells Tower (born 1973), American writer
 William Hogarth Tower (1871–1950), American philatelist
 William Lawrence Tower (1872–1967), American zoologist
 Zealous Bates Tower (1819–1900), American soldier

Towers
People with the surname Towers: 

 Bill Towers (politician) (1892–1962), Australian politician
 Bill Towers (footballer) (1920–2000), English footballer
 Frank Towers (1835–1886) Australian actor and playwright
 John Towers (disambiguation), several people
 John Towers (bishop) (died 1649), English churchman, Bishop of Peterborough
 John Towers (businessman) (born 1948), English founder of Phoenix Venture Holdings
 John Towers (footballer) (1913–1979), English footballer, played for Darlington
 John Towers (minister) (c. 1747–1804), English Independent minister
 John Henry Towers (1885–1955), United States Navy admiral and pioneer naval aviator
 John T. Towers (1809–1855), mayor of Washington, D.C. from 1854 to 1856
 Kevin Towers (1961–2018), American baseball player and general manager
 William Towers (disambiguation), several people
 William Towers (rugby union) (1861–1904), English-born rugby union forward, capped twice for Wales
 William Towers (Master of Christ's College, Cambridge) (1681–1745), priest and academic
 William Towers (countertenor), English countertenor

See also